White's Mill is a historic grist mill located near Abingdon, Washington County, Virginia. It dates to the mid-19th century, and is a frame two-story structure resting on a down slope basement with a full attic sheltered by a gable roof.  It has a Fitz waterwheel and great gear wheel, buhr runs, roller mills, elevators and bolting machinery.  Associated with the mill are the contributing earthen race which feeds directly into the wooden race and onto the wheel and an early coursed rubble limestone dam. The mill remains in working condition.

It was listed on the National Register of Historic Places in 1974.

References

External links
White's Mill website

Grinding mills in Virginia
Grinding mills on the National Register of Historic Places in Virginia
Museums in Washington County, Virginia
National Register of Historic Places in Washington County, Virginia
Mill museums in Virginia
Watermills in the United States